The Lord Nelson is a Grade II listed public house at 386 Old Kent Road, Bermondsey, London.

It is on the Campaign for Real Ale's National Inventory of Historic Pub Interiors.

It was built in the early 19th century.

References

Grade II listed pubs in London
National Inventory Pubs
Pubs in the London Borough of Southwark
Bermondsey
Grade II listed buildings in the London Borough of Southwark